Dynamic binding may refer to:
Dynamic binding (computing), also known as late binding
Dynamic scoping in programming languages
Dynamic binding (chemistry)

See also
Dynamic dispatch
Dynamic linking